Harpalus jureceki is a species of ground beetle in the subfamily Harpalinae. It was described by Jedlicka in 1928.

References

jureceki
Beetles described in 1928